Cornelis Corneliszoon Nay was a Dutch navigator and explorer who attempted to discover the Northeast Passage from Europe to the Far East.

Nay hailed from Enkhuizen in the Netherlands.

In June 1594, he set out from the Dutch island of Texel with a small fleet (consisting of three ships and a fishing sloop) to discover the Northeast Passage. Nay commanded the ship De Zwaan. He sailed together with Brandt Tetgales commanding the Mercurius. Fellow explorer Willem Barentsz, who commanded the third ship also called Mercurius (as well as the fishing boat), followed the coast of Novaya Zemlya, but his progress was halted by ice. Nay and Tetgales were more successful: they passed through the Yugor Strait and reached the Kara Sea.

Nay's success led to a second expedition the following year (1595) with a larger fleet, consisting of seven ships. The expedition was under the command of Nay. (something to which Barentsz was strongly opposed). Having left too late in the season, the explorers were soon stopped by the ice. Barentsz wanted to stop for the winter and continue in the spring, but Nay decided that the fleet should return home.

The Dutch government considered the expedition a total flop and refused to fund a new expedition. Nevertheless, a third attempt was made the next year, in 1596 - this time without Nay. This was the famed expedition during which Barentsz and his men managed to survive the winter on Novaya Zemlya, though Barentsz died on the way home.

Although Nay and Barentsz failed to find the passage to the East by way of the Arctic Sea, the Dutch journeys of exploration in the Arctic paved the way for large-scale whale and seal fishery which greatly enriched the Netherlands during the Dutch Golden Age.

Sources

External links 
 Bij noorden om: Olivier Brunel en de doorvaart naar China en Cathay in de zestiende eeuw (Marijke Spies)
 Hollandia, zeilend door de historie

16th-century Dutch explorers
Dutch polar explorers
Explorers of the Arctic
People from Enkhuizen